The 2015 Women's International Match Racing Series was a series of match racing sailing regattas staged during 2015 season.

Regattas

Standings

References

External links
 Official website

2015
2015 in sailing